The Nanbai are a Muslim community found in  the state of Uttar Pradesh in India. Many members of Nanbai community have migrated to Pakistan after independence and have settled in Karachi, Sindh.

History and origin
They specialise in baking fermented loaves, and are known to be experts in preparing tandoori breads, known as naans. This special type of baked bread is referred to as a Nan. The word Nanbai is from Persian نانوا Nānvā, meaning baker. The community is said to have evolved from the families of the cooks at the courts of the various Muslim rulers of North India.

Present circumstances
The Nanbai specialize in cooking and baking. Many are also involved in the running of tea stalls, while some have taken to rickshaw pulling, an activity in which a good number of Muslim artisan communities are now involved.

The Nanbai are an endogamous community, but have no system of gotras. They perceive themselves to be forming part of the Shaikh community.  The Nanbai  are Muslims of the Sunni sect. They are found mainly in the districts of Lukhnow, Faizabad, Barabanki, Kanpur, Aligarh and Moradabad, mainly found in urban areas. They speak Urdu and Hindi.

See also
 Hajjam
 Manihar
 Saifi
 Muslim Halwai
 Muslim Raibhat

References

Social groups of Uttar Pradesh
Muslim communities of India
Shaikh clans
Social groups of Pakistan
Muslim communities of Uttar Pradesh